Achnatherum robustum, commonly known as sleepy grass, (synonyms Stipa robusta, also Stipa vaseyi subsp. robusta) is a perennial plant in the Poaceae or grass family.

Distribution
It grows on dry soil in the U.S. Midwest, ranging from South Dakota, Nebraska and Kansas, Wyoming, Colorado and New Mexico to Texas and Arizona, California and Hawaii.

Ecology
Sleepy grass plants harboring a fungal species (of the genus Neotyphodium), contain ergoline compounds, such as lysergic acid amide (common name, ergine). These compounds appear to be responsible for the sedative effects on mammals when they ingest the infected grass.

References

External links
USDA Plants Profile for Achnatherum robustum (sleepygrass)

robustum
Bunchgrasses of North America
Grasses of the United States
Native grasses of the Great Plains region
Flora of the United States
Flora of the North-Central United States
Flora of the South-Central United States
Native grasses of Nebraska
Native grasses of Oklahoma
Native grasses of Texas